The following is a list of all team-to-team transactions that have occurred in the National Hockey League during the 2020–21 NHL season. It lists which team each player has been traded to, signed by, or claimed by, and for which player(s) or draft pick(s), if applicable. Players who have retired or that have had their contracts terminated are also listed. The 2020–21 NHL trade deadline was on April 12, 2021. Players traded or claimed off waivers after this date were not eligible to play in the 2021 Stanley Cup playoffs.

Retirement

Notes
1. Miller announced on April 29, 2021 that he would retire at the conclusion of the season; the Ducks played their final game of the year on May 8, 2021.

Contract terminations
A team and player may mutually agree to terminate a player's contract at any time. All players must clear waivers before having a contract terminated.

Buyouts can only occur at specific times of the year. For more details on contract terminations as buyouts:

Teams may buy out player contracts (after the conclusion of a season) for a portion of the remaining value of the contract, paid over a period of twice the remaining length of the contract. This reduced number and extended period is applied to the cap hit as well.
If the player was under the age of 26 at the time of the buyout the player's pay and cap hit will reduced by a factor of 2/3 over the extended period. 
If the player was 26 or older at the time of the buyout the player's pay and cap hit will reduced by a factor of 1/3 over the extended period. 
If the player was 35 or older at the time of signing the contract the player's pay will be reduced by a factor of 1/3, but the cap hit will not be reduced over the extended period.

Injured players cannot be bought out.

Notes
1. Miller was a draft-related restricted free agent for Arizona at the time of the termination, and was not under contract.

Free agency
Note: This does not include players who have re-signed with their previous team as an unrestricted free agent or as a restricted free agent.

Imports
This section is for players who were not previously on contract with NHL teams in the past season. Listed is the last team and league they were under contract with.

Trades
* Retained Salary Transaction: Each team is allowed up to three contracts on their payroll where they have retained salary in a trade (i.e. the player no longer plays with Team A due to a trade to Team B, but Team A still retains some salary). Only up to 50% of a player's contract can be kept, and only up to 15% of a team's salary cap can be taken up by retained salary. A contract can only be involved in one of these trades twice.

Hover over-retained salary or conditional transactions for more information.

October

December

January

February

March

April

July

Waivers 
Once an NHL player has played in a certain number of games or a set number of seasons has passed since the signing of his first NHL contract (see here), that player must be offered to all of the other NHL teams before he can be assigned to a minor league affiliate.

Expansion Draft 

The 2020–21 season saw the entrance of a 32nd team to the league, the Seattle Kraken. While Seattle did not begin to play until the 2021–22 NHL season, the team was active and allowed to make trades and sign free agents on April 30, 2021, after sending its final expansion payment to the NHL. To create a roster, an Expansion Draft was held on July 21.

Seattle followed the same rules for this draft as the Vegas Golden Knights in 2017, with the provision that Vegas was exempted from losing a player in the draft. Thus, Seattle was required to select one player from each of the other 30 existing teams, for a total of 30 players selected. At least 20 of the players selected had to be contracted for the 2021–22 season and Seattle is to take a minimum number of players at each position. Each of the thirty other teams are allowed to protect up to 11 players, but also had to expose a minimum number of players with NHL experience for Seattle to select at each position. Teams are required to protect players with no-movement clauses (or the player must waive it); all first- and second-year professionals, as well as all unsigned draft choices, and players determined to have career-ending injuries are exempt from selection and will not be counted toward their teams' protection limits.

On July 17, the 30 teams excluding Vegas submitted their expansion protection lists and they were published the next day. Seattle had from July 18 to 21 to negotiate with all exposed free agents; if Seattle came to terms with a player within this window, that player was counted as their previous team's expansion selection and Seattle was unable to select another player from that team. On July 21, Seattle's final roster was submitted and it was announced later that evening. Any players picked by Seattle cannot have their contracts bought out by the Kraken until the summer after the 2021–22 season.

See also
2020–21 NHL season
2020 NHL Entry Draft
2021 NHL Entry Draft
2020 in sports
2021 in sports
2019–20 NHL transactions
2021–22 NHL transactions

References

National Hockey League transactions
transactions